The 1990 Hammersmith and Fulham Council election took place on 3 May 1990 to elect members of Hammersmith and Fulham London Borough Council in London, England. The whole council was up for election and the Labour party stayed in overall control of the council.

Background

In five out of the six by-elections since the previous Council was elected, the previous party had retained the seat.  In May 1989 Labour won the seat previously held by Simon Knott for the Liberal Democrats, following his resignation from the Council.  He had held a seat on the Council since 1974, having also contested the previous three elections since the Council was originally formed in 1968.

Election result
The Labour Party won 28 seats - a loss of 12 seats from the 1986 election, but maintained control.  The Conservative Party won 22 seats - a gain of 13 seats from their previous result.  The Liberal Democrats lost their only seat on the council.

Ward results

Addison

Avonmore

Broadway

Brook Green

Colehill

College Park & Old Oak

Coningham

Crabtree

Eel Brook

Gibbs Green

Grove

Margravine

Normand

Palace

Ravenscourt

Sands End

Sherbrooke

Starch Green

Sulivan

Town

Walham

White City & Shepherds Bush

Wormholt

References

1990
Hammersmith and Fulham
20th century in the London Borough of Hammersmith and Fulham